Jacob Sørensen may also refer to:
Jacob Sørensen (footballer, born 1998) 
Jacob Sørensen (footballer, born 1983)